Herman Frison (born 16 April 1961, in Geel) is a former Belgian professional road bicycle racer and former assistant manager at Lotto-Soudal. During the 1987 Tour de France he managed to go on a solo attack during a relatively short stage that took place entirely within West Germany. Stage 4 was only about 80km long and went from Stuttgart to Pforzheim, but Frison managed to stay away from the peloton and win the stage by about a minute and a half ahead of the main field.

Major results

1984
Booischot
1985
Tongerlo
1986
GP Stad Vilvoorde
Leeuwse Pijl
Chaumont - Gistoux
1987
Peer
Four Days of Dunkirk
Tour de France:
Winner stage 4
Grote 1-Mei Prijs
1988
Polder-Kempen
Kalmthout
Humbeek
Geetbets
1989
Omloop Hageland-Zuiderkempen
Sint-Katelijne-Waver
Viane
1990
Nokere Koerse
Gent–Wevelgem
1991
Nationale Sluitingsprijs
Wetteren
1992
Wavre
Dilsen
1993
Druivenkoers Overijse
1994
Heusden O-Vlaanderen

External links 

Belgian male cyclists
1961 births
Living people
Belgian Tour de France stage winners
People from Geel
Cyclists from Antwerp Province